Vesna Radišić is a principal scientist and lead for engineered RF materials at Northrop Grumman. She received the bachelor's degree in Electrical Engineering from University of Belgrade, Serbia in 1991, master's degree from University of Colorado at Boulder in 1993 and Ph.D. degree from UCLA in 1998.

Before joining Northrop Grumman in 2002, she worked at Opnext and HRL Laboratories. In 2017, she was elected Fellow of the Institute of Electrical and Electronics Engineers "for contributions to millimeter- and submillimeter-wave sources, amplifiers, and monolithic integrated circuits."

References 

Fellow Members of the IEEE
Serbian engineers
University of Belgrade School of Electrical Engineering alumni
University of Colorado Boulder alumni
UCLA Henry Samueli School of Engineering and Applied Science alumni
Living people
Year of birth missing (living people)
Place of birth missing (living people)